Choi Jong-hwan (born September 24, 1964) is a South Korean actor. Choi won Producer's Award for his role in Gyebaek and The Duo at the MBC Drama Awards in 2011.

Filmography

Television series

Awards and nominations

References

External links

South Korean academics
South Korean male television actors
South Korean male film actors
Living people
1964 births
Seoul Institute of the Arts alumni
Sogang University alumni